Madarellus is a genus of flower weevils in the family Curculionidae. There are at least 50 described species in Madarellus.

Species
These 52 species belong to the genus Madarellus:

References

Further reading

 
 
 
 
 

Baridinae